Mangler transformation, also known as Mangler-Stepanov transformation (Stepanov 1947, Mangler 1948, Schlichting 1955),
reduces the axisymmetric  boundary layer equations to the plane boundary layer equations.

The transformation transforms the equations of axisymmetric boundary layer with external velocity  in terms of original variables  into the equations of plane boundary layer with external velocity  in terms of the new variables . The transformation is given by the formulas

where  is a constant length,  is the distance from the point on the wall to the axis.

References
.
.

Boundary layers